Jorge González (31 January 1966 – 22 September 2010) was an Argentine basketball player, professional wrestler, and actor, better known for his appearances in World Championship Wrestling under the ring name El Gigante between 1989 and 1992 and in the World Wrestling Federation under the ring name Giant Gonzalez in 1993. González remains the tallest Argentinian to have ever lived and the third tallest man from South America.

Early life 
Jorge González was born in El Colorado, Formosa, Argentina on 31 January 1966.

Basketball career 
Subsequently, León Najnudel, then coach of the Argentine national team, recommended the board of Gimnasia y Esgrima La Plata to sign the player for the team's Argentine second division roster. During 1986, González helped Gimnasia achieve promotion to the Argentine first division. He then signed for Sport Club Cañadense, but saw little action due to an injury that left him off the court for nine months.

National team 
Coach León Najnudel included González in the Argentine national team who took part of the 1985 South American Basketball Championship (bronze medal) and the 1988 Tournament of the Americas (5th place), where he attracted the attention of the Atlanta Hawks' scouts.

NBA career 
González took part in the 1988 NBA draft, being chosen by the Atlanta Hawks in the third round (#54 selection). Along with Hernán Montenegro (drafted #57), they became the first Argentine players drafted in the NBA. The Hawks bought the player's rights from his Argentine team for a 30,000 Argentine australes fee. However, he was unable to adapt to the physical demands of NBA basketball, partly due to a serious knee injury.

Professional wrestling career

World Championship Wrestling (1989–1992) 
In 1989, Hawks owner Ted Turner offered González a job as a professional wrestler in World Championship Wrestling (WCW), which Turner also owned. After a year of training, González was introduced to fans as El Gigante on 19 May 1990 at the pay-per-view Capital Combat. Wearing shorts, he competed as a fan favorite and was billed as being close to eight feet tall.

Over the next two years, he feuded with Ric Flair for the WCW World Heavyweight Championship, participated in a Chamber of Horrors match in 1991 and also had a date on TBS with Missy Hyatt. The point of the feud was to determine who the real "giant of WCW" was. He also had a cross promotional stint in the New Japan Pro-Wrestling (NJPW) promotion before signing with the World Wrestling Federation (WWF) in 1993.

According to Ron Reis, Gonzalez was set to make a return to the company at their 1995 pay-per-view Halloween Havoc in the role of "The Yeti", an insurance policy put in place to make sure Hulk Hogan did not retain the WCW Championship against The Giant. The plan behind his return was to set up  an idea Kevin Sullivan (who was the booker of the promotion at the time) had for the pay-per-view World War 3 1995 the following month. It would be  a three ring, 60 man, over the top rope battle royal, with a giant occupying each of the three rings. But the idea fell through as González had a diabetes attack backstage at the Halloween Havoc pay-per-view leading him to have to be flown back to his native Argentina and  Ron Reis had to take his spot in the role.

World Wrestling Federation (1993) 
González competed as Giant Gonzalez during his time in the WWF. González grew a beard and wore a full body suit that featured airbrushed muscles with bushy hair attached. He was introduced at the Royal Rumble in January 1993, where he eliminated Harvey Wippleman's nemesis The Undertaker from the Royal Rumble match despite not being an official participant. At WrestleMania IX, González lost to The Undertaker by disqualification after he knocked out the Undertaker using chloroform. After another loss to The Undertaker at SummerSlam, the feud came to an end, and after the match, Wippleman berated him, before González turned on Wippleman himself, turning face in the process. He lost to Randy Savage on WWF on TSN on 1 September. 

The foundation was later set for a feud between González and Adam Bomb, but it never truly began. His last appearance in WWF was on 4 October episode of Monday Night Raw in a 20-man battle royal match for the Intercontinental Championship. González was the first eliminated by "Macho Man" Randy Savage, Diesel, Bastion Booger, 1-2-3 Kid, Marty Jannetty, Adam Bomb and Bam Bam Bigelow. Three days later, WWF announced that González left the company after his WWF contract had expired on 7 October 1993.

New Japan Pro-Wrestling and WAR (1994–1995) 
After his departure from the WWF, González wrestled in the Japanese promotions NJPW and WAR (Wrestle and Romance) until his retirement from wrestling, and used his old ring name El Gigante. His last singles match was on 8 February 1995, when he lost to The Great Muta. On 8 December 1995, González wrestled his final match, teaming with Kōji Kitao in a loss to Shinja and Typhoon by countout.

Acting career 
González played the role of Manny, a carnival sideshow giant in a 1993 episode of Baywatch, who befriends Hobie, but later falls into the water and his large size makes it difficult to be rescued. González also had roles in the 1993 and 1994 Thunder in Paradise double-episode turned movies. In 1994 González made a short appearance as Eryx the Boxer in Hercules in the Underworld, a television prequel film from the television series Hercules: The Legendary Journeys.

Retirement 
In December 1995, González retired from professional wrestling due to serious health issues and returned home to Argentina.

After his retirement from wrestling, González lived on a ranch in Argentina in his later years. His former manager Harvey Wippleman would send his own money to maintain González and his family. In October 2009, he began using a wheelchair, and also had to use a dialysis machine due to his failing kidneys. The Argentine Basketball Federation also helped Gonzalez with finances in his final years, including donations of appliances for his house, clothes and medicine. González was married and had one step-daughter.

Death

González died due to complications from diabetes type 1 and severe heart issues on 22 September 2010, in his hometown of San Martin, Argentina at the age of 44.

Filmography

Championships and accomplishments 
 Pro Wrestling Illustrated
 PWI ranked him No. 112 of the 500 best singles wrestlers in the PWI 500 in 1991
 PWI ranked him No. 498 of the top 500 singles wrestlers of the PWI Years in 1993
 Wrestling Observer Newsletter
 Worst Feud of the Year (1993)

See also 
 List of premature professional wrestling deaths
 List of tallest people

References

External links 
 The Tallest Man: Jorge González
 
 
 

1966 births
2010 deaths
20th-century professional wrestlers
Argentine expatriate basketball people in the United States
Argentine expatriate sportspeople in the United States
Argentine male professional wrestlers
Argentine men's basketball players
Atlanta Hawks draft picks
Deaths from diabetes
Gimnasia y Esgrima de La Plata basketball players
People from Formosa Province
People with gigantism
Wheelchair users